The 1982 FIA European Formula 3 Championship was the eighth edition of the FIA European Formula 3 Championship. The championship consisted of 15 rounds across the continent. The season was won by Argentine Oscar Larrauri, with Emanuele Pirro second and Alain Ferté in third.

Calendar

Results

Championship standings

Drivers' championship

References

External links 

1982 in motorsport
FIA European Formula 3 Championship